Jean-Michel Wilmotte (born 1948 in Soissons) is a French architect.

Biography
Jean-Michel Wilmotte studied interior design at the Camondo school of interior design in Paris. Just two years after graduating, he founded his own agency in Paris in 1975. His style influenced a number of personalities, including François Mitterrand, who asked him to design part of his private apartments in the Elysée Palace in 1982. Soon after, the mayor of Nîmes, Jean Bousquet, commissioned the redevelopment of the city hall and the Museum of Fine Arts.

Jean-Michel Wilmotte earned his degree in architecture in 1993, allowing him to work on large scale and to develop the concept of "interior design of cities", while maintaining the same attention to the use of "noble materials and extreme attention to finishes" notable in his smaller scaled works.
Over the years, the agency has diversified and operates primarily in five key areas: architecture, interior design, museology, urbanism and design. An attention to details allows Jean-Michel Wilmotte and his team to work from the smallest to the largest scale: moving from a house to a skyscraper, from a shop to a corporate headquarters, from a gallery of art to a museum, and from street furnitures to urban design.

Currently, the Wilmotte & Associates agency has 185 employees from 40 different countries. It has now taken an international and multicultural dimension, with projects in over twenty countries around the world. The firm is established in four locations in Paris, one in Sophia-Antipolis, one in London and one in Seoul.

In 2005, the Wilmotte Foundation was created to promote the urban craft through the W Prize, with the goal of helping and encouraging young architects. In 2010, according to a study by UK magazine Building Design, the agency is listed in the world ranking of the 100 largest architecture firms, holding the 73rd spot in 2011.

Under Construction
Paris (France), Palais de la Mutualité, conversion into a conference center, 13 000 m².
 Cannes (France), Palais des Festivals, rehabilitation of Auditoriums, 4 000 m².
 Issy-les-Moulineaux (France), École de Formation du Barreau, construction, 10 500 m².
 Nice (France), Allianz Riviera, stadium, construction, 54 000 m².
 Geneva (Switzerland), International School of Geneva, conception of a Centre of Arts, 3 000 m².
 Montrouge (France), Campus Montrouge, conversion and construction, 40 000 m².
 Orly (France), Coeur d’Orly, offices, 20 000 m².
 Rueil-Malmaison (France), Green Office, 33 500 m².
 Maranello-Fiorano (Italy), Nuova Gestione Sportiva, 22 000 m².
 Courchevel (France), 80 housing, construction, 6 000 m².
 Versailles (France), Résidence for the Hospital Richaud, conversion and construction, 20 000 m².
 Monaco, Giroflées, residential tower, 29 000 m²
 Monaco, Teotista, residential tower, 7 000 m².
 Moscow (Russia), Red October, lofts, 22 000 m².
 Paris (France), Musée d’Orsay, museographical design of 3 spaces, 2 400 m².
 Amsterdam (Nederland), Rijksmuseum, museographical design, 12 000m².
 Val-de-Chalvagne (France),  Le domaine de la Chaume, lodging, hotel-spa, farm, 45 000 m².
 Saint-Quentin (France), Quai Gayant, 12 ha.
 Kyiv Business Park (Ukraine), tower and theater, 600 000 m² on 19 ha.
 Rio de Janeiro (Brazil),  Rio Centro, construction of a new pavilion, hotel and FIFA offices, 54 000 m².

Selected Projects
1988–2000 : Paris (France), Musée du Louvre – Grand Louvre, Aile Richelieu, Aile Rohan, Pavillon des Sessions : Muséography, shops, restaurants.
1989 : Tokyo (Japan), Cultural Centre of Bunkamura, 3,000 m².
1991–1998 : Lyon (France), Museum of Fine Arts, Palace St Pierre, museography, 14,000 m².
1994 : Lisbon (Portugal), National Museum of Contemporary Art, restructuration, 3 400 m².
1994 : Paris (France), Champs-Élysées, new street furniture, lighting, benches and traffic lights.
1995 : Karuizawa (Japan), Museum of art Mercian, rehabilitation of a former distillery, 3,000 m².
1996–1998 : Luxembourg, Bank of Luxembourg, furnitures for the headquarters, and design for the agencies of the Station and Kirschberg.
1996 : Cognac (France), Showroom Hennessy, construction of a museum and renovation of offices, 5,500 m².
1998–2004 : Paris (France), Collège de France, restructuration, extension, 25 700 m².
2000 : Seoul (South Korea), Incheon International Airport, interior design, 300,000 m².
2000–2006 : Sarran (France), Museum of President Jacques-Chirac, construction and museography, 1,500 m².
2000–2010 : Cartier, Chaumet, Fred, Montblanc International : new concept stores in Europe, USA and Asia.
2000–2006 : Orléans, Lyon, Valenciennes (France): Tramway.
2000– 2002 : Bordeaux (France), Rue Sainte-Catherine urban design, 1,7 km, creation of a square.
2001– 2010 : Le Puy-en-Velay (France), Hôtel du Département, Hôtel Dieu, extension and restructuration.
2003 : Bordeaux (France), Palais des Congrès, extension and restructuration, 10 890 m².
2003 - 2005 : Seongnam (South Korea), le site wilmotte, Ecological residential complex, 9,714 m².
2004 : Paris (France), LVMH, interior design of the new headquarters, 4,000 m².
2004 : Paris (France), Avenue de France, restructuration and street furnitures.
2005 : Bordeaux (France), Banque Populaire du Sud Ouest, construction of the new headquarters, 12,000 m².
2005 : Lisbonne (Portugal), Bouygues Immobiliaria, construction, 8,000 m².
2005 : Volgograd (Russia) :  Docks Central, Master Plan.
2006 : Paris (France), Bouygues, restructuration of the headquarters, 7,500 m².
2006 : Ivry-sur-Seine (France), Le Partitio-Issylec, construction and restructuration, 62,500 m².
2006 : Dijon (France), Place de la Libération, 6,000 m².
2006 : Forlì, (Italy), San Domenico, restructuration, museography and furnitures, 5,000 m².
2006 : Paris (France), urban furnitures for the new line of the Tramway des Maréchaux Sud.
2007 : Monaco, Novotel, construction, 218 rooms, 22 flats, 15 146 m².
2007 : Latina (Italy), Master plan for downtown.
2007 : Beijing (China), Ullens Center for Contemporary Art, rehabilitation of a factory into a museum of contemporary art, 7,500 m².
2008 : Doha (Qatar), Museum of Islamic Art, Doha, restructuration and museography, 5 250 m².
2008 : Paris (France), Collège des Bernardins, restructuration, 5,000 m².
2008 : Béziers (France), Médiathèque André Malraux, construction, 9,000 m².
2009 : Ramatuelle (France), Hôtel La Réserve, restructuration and interior design, 8 280 m².
2009 : Rouen (France), Docks 76, rehabilitation, extension to create a mall, 47,000 m².
2010 : Paris (France), Brain and Spine Institute, construction, 22,000 m².
2010 : Fréjus (France),  Theater, 5 300 m².
2010 : Paris (France), Fiat Motor Village, restructuration, interior design for the show-room, 1 340 m².
2011 : Paris (France), Mandarin Oriental Hotel, rehabilitation of offices into an hotel 5*, 22,000 m².
2014 : Paris (France), Russian Cultural Center', Quai Branly and Avenue Rapp 
2017 : Paris (France), Station F, rehabilitation of a historic rail depot into a startup business facility, 34,000 m².
2021 : Paris (France), Grand Palais Éphémère, exhibition hall, 10 000 m².

Bibliography
 Ceci n'est pas un parc, entretien avec Jean-Michel Wilmotte. Éditions Libel, Lyon (France), 2010 
   Jean-Michel Wilmotte, Architecture – Ecriture, Dane McDowell, Éditions Aubanel, Paris (France), 2009 
   Jean-Michel Wilmotte, Architectures à l'oeuvre, François Lamarre, Pascal Tournaire, Stéphane Paoli, Éditions Le Moniteur, Paris (France), 2008 
    Wilmotte, l'instinct architecte, Jean Grisoni, Jean-Baptiste Loubeyre, Éditions Le Passage, Paris (France), 2005 
   Architecture intérieure des villes, Jean-Michel Wilmotte, Paul Virilio, Éditions du Moniteur, Paris (France), 1999 
  Jean-Michel Wilmotte, Francis Rambert, Éditions du Regard, Paris (France), 1996 
  Réalisations et projets, Jean-Michel Wilmotte, Éditions du Moniteur, Paris (France), 1993 
  Wilmotte'', Jean-Louis Pradel, Éditions Electa Moniteur, Paris (France), 1988

References

External links

 Wilmotte & Associés Architectes

 Mobilier national : Jean-Michel Wilmotte

1948 births
Living people
People from Soissons
20th-century French architects
21st-century French architects
Architects of cathedrals
Members of the Académie d'architecture
People associated with the Louvre